Manhunters: Fugitive Task Force is a half-hour reality-television show that premiered on A&E in December 2008. It chronicled US Marshals and local law enforcement as they hunted down some of America's worst fugitives. The show's 60 episodes' primary focus was on the New York/New Jersey Regional Fugitive Task Force based out of New York City. The show's first season averaged 1.6 million viewers.

About the Fugitive Task Force
The New York/New Jersey Regional Fugitive Task Force (NY/NJ RFTF) became operational in May 2002. It has Memoranda of Understanding with over 80 federal, state, or local agencies and three offices in the New York/New Jersey area.

The force was mandated by Congress after the September 11 attacks, and US Marshalls allowed to show to be made because of its public relations value.

Main cast
 Commander (Chief Inspector) Lenny DePaul - US Marshals Service
 Supervisor Thomas "Tommy" Kilbride - US Immigration and Customs Enforcement (ICE)
 Senior Inspector Greg Holmes - US Marshals Service
 Detective Roxanne "Roxy" Lopez - Spring Valley, NY, Police Department
 Detective Dave "Hummy" Humeston - Spring Valley, NY, Police Department
 Deputy Michelle "Michy" Mendez - US Marshals Service
 Detective Rasheen "Pep" Peppers - Newark, NJ, Police Department
 Senior Inspector Mike Romani - US Marshals Service
 Senior Parole Officer Vinny Senzamici - New York State Division of Parole
 Special Agent Hector Colon - US Immigration and Customs Enforcement (ICE)
 Deputy Michelle Rios-Marsala - US Marshals Service
 Deputy Nicholas "Nick" Ricigliano - US Marshals Service

Participating agencies
Federal Agencies
 United States Marshals Service
 Bureau of Alcohol, Tobacco, Firearms, and Explosives
 Bureau of Immigration and Customs Enforcement
 Drug Enforcement Administration
 Department of Housing and Urban Development, OIG
 Federal Bureau of Investigation
 United States Probation Service
 United States Secret Service
 United States Department of Veterans Affairs Police

Regional agencies
New York/New Jersey High Density Drug Trafficking Area
 Port Authority of New York and New Jersey Police Department

	
New Jersey
 Atlantic City Police Department
 Atlantic City Prosecutor's and Sheriff's Office
 Bergen County Prosecutor's and Sheriff's Office
 Burlington County Prosecutor's and Sheriff's Office
 Camden County Prosecutor's and Sheriff's Office
 Camden Police Department
 Cape May County Prosecutor's and Sheriff's Office
 Cumberland County Prosecutor's and Sheriff's Office
 Deptford Township Police Department
 Eatontown Police Department
 Essex County Prosecutor's and Sheriff's Office
 Gloucester County Prosecutor's and Sheriff's Office
 Hudson County Prosecutor's and Sheriff's Office
 Hamilton Police Department
 Hunterdon County Prosecutor's and Sheriff's Office
 Jersey City Police Department
 Mercer County Prosecutor's and Sheriff's Office
 Middlesex Prosecutor's and Sheriff's Office
 Monmouth Prosecutor's and Sheriff's Office
 Morris County Prosecutor's and Sheriff's Office
 Newark Police Department
 New Jersey Attorney General's Office
 New Jersey Department of Corrections
 New Jersey Department of Human Services Police
 New Jersey State Parole
 New Jersey State Police
 Ocean County Prosecutor's and Sheriff's Office
 Passaic County Prosecutor's and Sheriff's Office
 Paterson Police Department
 Pleasantville Police Department
 Salem County Prosecutor's and Sheriff's Office
 Somerset County Prosecutor's and Sheriff's Office
 Sussex County Prosecutor's and Sheriff's Office
 Trenton Police Department
 Union County Prosecutor's and Sheriff's Office
 Warren County Prosecutor's and Sheriff's Office
  	
New York
 Dutchess County Sheriff's Office
 Glen Clove Police Department
 Mt. Vernon Police Department
 Nassau County District Attorney
 Nassau County Police Department
 Nassau County Probation Department
 Nassau County Sheriff's Office
 New York City Police Department
 New York National Guard
 New York State Corrections IG
 New York State Parole
 New York State Police
 Orange County Sheriff's Office
 Putnam County Sheriff's Department
 Riverhead Police Department
 Rockland County Sheriff's Department
 Spring Valley Police Department
 Suffolk County District Attorney
 Suffolk County Police Department
 Suffolk County Probation Department
 Suffolk County Sheriff's Department

References

External links
 A&E's Manhunters site

2008 American television series debuts
2008 American television series endings
2000s American reality television series
2000s American crime television series
English-language television shows